Operation Dawn 4 was an Iranian operation of the Iran–Iraq War launched in October 1983. At the end of the operation Iran had captured a small amount of territory from the Iraqis.

Units of Iraq's 1st Corps spent two months in their trenches waiting for the Iranians to attack. This included exerted a significant amount of pressure on Penjwen.

Saddam Hussein responded with a counterattack, using the Iraqi Republican Guard and poison gas. However, they failed to dislodge the Iranians, who were dug-in and reinforced by Kurdish fighters.

The battle
The focus of the fourth Dawn operation in October 1983 was the northern sector in Iranian Kurdistan. Three Iranian regular divisions, the Revolutionary Guard, and Kurdistan Democratic Party (KDP) elements amassed in Marivan and Sardasht in a move to threaten the major Iraqi city Suleimaniyah. Iran's strategy was to press Kurdish tribes to occupy the Banjuin Valley, which was within 45 km (28 mi) of Suleimaniyah and 140 km (87 mi) from the oilfields of Kirkuk. To stem the tide, Iraq deployed Mi-8 helicopters equipped with chemical weapons and executed 120 sorties against the Iranian force, which stopped them 15 km (9.3 mi) into Iraqi territory. 5,000 Iranians and 18,000 Iraqis were killed & wounded.

Iran gained 110 km² (42 sq mi) of its territory back in the north, gained 15 km² (5.8 sq mi) of Iraqi land, and captured 785 Iraqi prisoners while Iraq abandoned large quantities of valuable weapons and war materiel in the field. Iraq responded to these losses by firing a series of SCUD-B missiles into the cities of Dezful, Masjid Suleiman, and Behbehan, while the Iraqi naval aircraft mined the port of Bandar Khomeini. Iran's use of artillery against Basra while the battles in the north raged created multiple fronts, which effectively confused and wore down Iraq.

Aftermath
The attack was so successful, Saddam Hussein called for a remobilisation of the Iraqi army. Unlike other operations and battles of the Iran–Iraq War, environmental conditions and operative restrictions were of high significance for this operation. Also the military medicine organization of the Pasdaran was important in this battle; they used special methods to save the wounded and carried out rescue operations.

However, in response to this victory, the Iraqis launched the first Scud missiles into Iran, hitting six cities.

Units

Iran

Islamic Revolutionary Guard Corps:
Hamzeh Sayyed-osh-Shohada Headquarters
31st Ashura Division
Commanded by Mehdi Bakeri
44th Qamar-e Bani-Hashem Brigade
41st Tharallah Division
Commanded by Qassem Soleimani
17th Ali ibn Abi Taleb Division
Commanded by Mehdi Zeinoddin
25th Karbala Division
Commanded by Morteza Ghorbani
14th Imam Hossein Division
Commanded by Hossein Kharrazi
8th Najaf Ashraf Division
Commanded by Ahmad Kazemi

Islamic Republic of Iran Army Ground Forces
 28th Infantry Division of Kordestan
 21st Hamzeh Division of Azarbaijan

Iraq
 Iraqi Army
 Republican Guard
 Iraqi Army Air Corps
 Iraqi Air Force

See also
 Operation Dawn 2
 Operation Karbala Ten
 Iran–Iraq War#List of major Iranian operations during the war

References

 The Longest War, by Dilip Hiro, Routledge, Chapman, and Hall, Inc. 1991 (pg. 102).
 https://web.archive.org/web/20090910023608/http://www.gloria-center.org/meria/2009/06/dodds-wilson.html

Bibliography
 http://smallwarsjournal.com/jrnl/art/the-“dawn-of-victory”-campaigns-to-the-“final-push”-part-three-of-three

Dawn 4
Military operations involving chemical weapons during the Iran–Iraq War
Military operations of the Iran–Iraq War involving the Peshmerga